Blake House may refer to:

Blake House, the town house of Sir William Blake, building now predecessor to Buckingham Palace.
in the United States (by state)
Blake House (Bentonville, Arkansas), listed on the National Register of Historic Places (NRHP) in Benton County, Arkansas
Blake Garden (Kensington, California)
Blake House (Bangor, Maine), listed on the NRHP in Penobscot County, Maine
James Blake House, Boston, MA, listed on the NRHP in Massachusetts
John P. and Dora Blake House, Kirkwood, MO, listed on the NRHP in St. Louis County, Missouri
John Blake House, Maybrook, NY, listed on the NRHP in Orange County, New York
Blake House (Arden, North Carolina), listed on the NRHP in Buncombe County, North Carolina
Chairman Blake House, Davidson, NC, listed on the NRHP in Mecklenburg County, North Carolina
H.G. Blake House, Medina, OH, listed on the NRHP in Medina County, Ohio
Blake Ranch House, Gustave, SD, listed on the NRHP in Harding County, South Dakota
Wallace Blake House, St. George, UT, listed on the NRHP in Washington County, Utah